Youwanjela is a genus of air-breathing land snails, terrestrial pulmonate gastropod mollusks in the family Camaenidae.

Species
 Youwanjela wilsoni (Solem, 1979)

References

 Bank, R. A. (2017). Classification of the Recent terrestrial Gastropoda of the World. Last update: July 16th, 2017

External links
 Köhler, F.; Shea, M. (2012). Youwanjela, a new genus of land snail from the Kimberley, Western Australia (Eupulmonata, Camaenidae). Zoosystematics and Evolution. 88(1): 25-31

Camaenidae